Angoor may refer to:

 Angoor (1982 film), a 1982 Hindi film
 Angoor (2013 film), a 2013 Hindi film
 Angoor Ada, village in Waziristan, Pakistan
 Angoori, a dessert that has the shape of a grape